The Climb is a dramatic film directed by Bob Swaim starring John Hurt, Gregory Smith, David Strathairn, Marla Sokoloff, and Sarah Buxton. An unlikely pair develops a relationship in search of freedom from the inequities and colliding with the inevitabilities of life. It was re-released on DVD 21 August 2007.

Plot
John Langer (John Hurt), a crusty old civil engineer, has an arsenal full of memories. With irreverent wit, he rattles on, in his irascible humorous style, burning his spicy stories into the imagination of a young neighbour kid, Danny Himes (Gregory Smith). Danny is a gifted, spirited athlete with something to prove. Worldly, old man Langer has turned his back on proving anything at all.

Langer and Danny seem an unlikely pair, but their relationship soon turns from young caregiver/caretaker to student/mentor to comrades on a quest to free themselves individually from life's inequities and inevitabilities.

It is post World War II. Danny's father, Earl (David Strathairn), did not serve in the military and is considered a coward. Danny excels to overcome his father's reputation while Earl is actually more a man than the town knows.

Cast

Reception

Awards
 The UNICEF Award – Berlin German
 Winner of the Jury Grand Prix – Vienna Film Festival
 Pierrot D'or Grand Prix – Pierrot Gourmand Film Festival
 Special Mention – Montreal Film Festival
 The Prix du Public – Giffoni Film Festival
 Best Picture – New Zealand Film Award
 Official Viewer's Choice – Temecula Valley Intern'l Film Festival
 Best Action Adventure – Houston Film Festival
 Best Action Adventure – Flagstaff Film Festival

External links
The Climb – The Official DVD Site

1999 films
1999 independent films
Films directed by Bob Swaim
New Zealand independent films
1999 drama films
1990s English-language films
New Zealand drama films